Pseudheleodromia is a genus of flies in the family Empididae.

Species
P. helvetica Wagner, 2001

References

Empidoidea genera
Empididae